Marwysgafn is a Welsh term meaning a "deathbed song". Used by poets when they sense they are close to death, the poet confesses and asks for forgiveness. Marwysgafns were primarily popular during the Poets of the Princes period.

References 

Songs about death
Death customs
Genres of poetry